Lough Gill is a freshwater lake in the southwest of Ireland. It is located on the Dingle Peninsula in County Kerry.

Geography

Hydrology
Lough Gill is considered a natural lagoon, draining into Tralee Bay. It is fed by the Killiney River and another unnamed stream.

Natural history
Fish species in Lough Gill include three-spined stickleback, sand goby, brown trout, flounder and the critically endangered European eel. The lake is part of the Tralee Bay and Magharees Peninsula, West to Cloghane Special Area of Conservation.

See also
List of loughs in Ireland

References

Gill